WTHM-LP is a Christian News/Talk formatted broadcast radio station licensed to Ravenswood, West Virginia, serving the Ravenswood/Ripley area.  WTHM-LP is owned and operated by Mountain State Community Radio, Inc.

References

External links
 

2015 establishments in West Virginia
THM-LP
Radio stations established in 2015
THM-LP